Mulyanka is a rural locality (a settlement) in Lobanovskoye Rural Settlement, Permsky District, Perm Krai, Russia. The population was 2,451 as of 2010. There are 53 streets.

Geography 
Mulyanka is located 29 km south of Perm (the district's administrative centre) by road. Gribanovo is the nearest rural locality.

References 

Rural localities in Permsky District